The 2019 Rakuten Japan Open Tennis Championships was a men's tennis tournament played on outdoor hard courts. It was the 46th edition of the Japan Open, and part of the ATP Tour 500 series of the 2019 ATP Tour. It was held at the Ariake Coliseum in Tokyo, Japan, from September 30–October 6, 2019.

Singles main-draw entrants

Seeds

 1 Rankings are as of September 23, 2019.

Other entrants
The following players received wildcards into the singles main draw:
  Taro Daniel
  Go Soeda
  Yūichi Sugita

The following player received entry as a special exempt:
  Lloyd Harris

The following players received entry from the qualifying draw:
  Pablo Andújar 
  John Millman 
  Alexei Popyrin 
  Yasutaka Uchiyama

Withdrawals
Before the tournament
  Kevin Anderson → replaced by  Lorenzo Sonego
  Laslo Đere → replaced by  Juan Ignacio Londero
  Pierre-Hugues Herbert → replaced by  Jordan Thompson
  Kei Nishikori → replaced by  Miomir Kecmanović
  Milos Raonic → replaced by  Yoshihito Nishioka
  Stan Wawrinka → replaced by  Filip Krajinović

Doubles main-draw entrants

Seeds

 Rankings are as of September 23, 2019.

Other entrants
The following pairs received wildcards into the doubles main draw:
  Luke Bambridge /  Ben McLachlan 
  Fabrice Martin /  Yasutaka Uchiyama

The following pair received entry from the qualifying draw:
  Divij Sharan /  Artem Sitak

Champions

Singles

  Novak Djokovic def.  John Millman 6–3, 6–2

Doubles

  Nicolas Mahut /  Édouard Roger-Vasselin def.  Nikola Mektić /  Franko Škugor, 7–6(9–7), 6–4

References

External links